Knowsley Metropolitan Borough Council Elections were held on 7 May 1998.  One-third of the council was up for election and the Labour party kept overall control of the council.

After the election, the composition of the council was
Labour 65
Liberal Democrat 1

Election result

References

1998
1998 English local elections
1990s in Merseyside